Robert McElroy was mayor of Hamilton, Ontario from 1862 to 1864.

References 

1810s births
1881 deaths
Mayors of Hamilton, Ontario